Los Supergenios De La Mesa Cuadrada (often shortened to Chespirito) is a Mexican television sitcom, popular in Latin America, Spain, and the United States, among other countries.

Chespirito first appeared in 1968 was produced by Televisión Independiente de México (TIM).

El Chavo episodes in  syndication average 91 million daily viewers in all of the markets where it is distributed in the Americas. Since it ceased production in 1992, it has earned an estimated US$1.7 billion in syndication fees alone for Televisa.

References 

Mexican television sitcoms